Bethel is a suburb on the east side of St Austell in Cornwall, England, United Kingdom (where the population was included). Bethel is included within the St Austell Bethel division of Cornwall Council. It is located at

References

St Austell
Populated places in Cornwall